New Mexico State Road 12 (NM 12) is a primarily west–east state road in western New Mexico. NM 12 is located entirely within Catron County. The road's original alignment ran south from its western terminus to near Mule Creek, but this section was later removed. The road was designated a State Highway by the New Mexico legislature in 1917. State Road 12 was paved during the 1950s.

Major intersections

See also

References

External links

012
Transportation in Catron County, New Mexico